Gennadi Egorovich Korshikov (born 19 February 1949) is a Russian rower who competed for the Soviet Union in the 1972 Summer Olympics and in the 1976 Summer Olympics.

He was born in Leningrad.

In 1972 he and his partner Aleksandr Timoshinin won the gold medal in the double sculls event.

Four years later he and his partner Evgeni Barbakov finished fourth in the 1976 double sculls competition.

References

External links
 

1949 births
Living people
Russian male rowers
Soviet male rowers
Olympic rowers of the Soviet Union
Rowers at the 1972 Summer Olympics
Rowers at the 1976 Summer Olympics
Olympic gold medalists for the Soviet Union
Olympic medalists in rowing
World Rowing Championships medalists for the Soviet Union
Medalists at the 1972 Summer Olympics
European Rowing Championships medalists